The Men's 1500 metres event at the 2013 European Athletics U23 Championships was held in Tampere, Finland, at Ratina Stadium on 13 and 14 July.

Medalists

Results

Final
14 July 2013 

Intermediate times:
400m: 1:02.45 Pieter-Jan Hannes 
800m: 2:05.83 Pieter-Jan Hannes 
1200m: 3:03.30 Damian Roszko

Heats
Qualified: First 4 in each heat (Q) and 4 best performers (q) advance to the Final

Summary

Details

Heat 1
13 July 2013 / 11:00

Intermediate times:
400m: 59.85 Alberto Imedio 
800m: 2:01.82 Alberto Imedio 
1200m: 3:01.13 Pieter-Jan Hannes

Heat 2
13 July 2013 / 11:10

Intermediate times:
400m: 1:00.44 Bryan Cantero 
800m: 2:02.89 Bryan Cantero 
1200m: 3:01.71 Bryan Cantero

Participation
According to an unofficial count, 24 athletes from 16 countries participated in the event.

References

1500 metres
1500 metres at the European Athletics U23 Championships